Jaltomata grandiflora is a rare plant species native to the Mexican State of Michoacán.

Jaltomata grandiflora is a perennial herb to subshrub, up to 100 cm tall. Flowers are white to pale green with darker green spots and uncolored nectar. Fruits at maturity are pale purple.

References

grandiflora
Flora of Michoacán